Blankenship-Hodges-Brown House is a historic home located in Ray Township, Morgan County, Indiana.  It was built about 1875, and is a -story, Queen Anne / Stick style brick dwelling.  It rests on a stone foundation and features a steeply pitched roof, decorative timbering, brackets, and overhanging eaves.

It was listed on the National Register of Historic Places in 2005.

References

Houses on the National Register of Historic Places in Indiana
Queen Anne architecture in Indiana
Houses completed in 1875
Houses in Morgan County, Indiana
National Register of Historic Places in Morgan County, Indiana